A navigation bar (or navigation system) is a section of a graphical user interface intended to aid visitors in accessing information. Navigation bars are implemented in operating systems, file browsers, web browsers, apps, web sites and other similar user interfaces.

File browsers 

File browsers use a navigation bar to assist the user in traversing the filesystem. Navigation bars may include the current path, breadcrumbs, or a list of favorites.

Web browsers 
A web browser navigation bar includes the back and forward buttons, as well as the Location bar where URLs are entered. Formerly, the functionality of the navigation bar was split between the browser's toolbar and the address bar, but Google Chrome introduced the practice of merging the two.

Web design 
Typically, websites will have a primary navigation bar and sometimes secondary navigation bar on all pages. These webpage sections will include links to the most important sections of the site. The implementation and design of navigation bars is a crucial aspects of web design and web usability.

In general, navigation bars are found in a page's header, but may also be found in the form of a sidebar.

HTML5 nav tag 

Some early versions of Netscape used the HTML  tag to construct a navigation bar to navigate web sites. Today the  tag can be used for the same purpose.  In HTML5, navigation elements are enclosed in a <nav> tag, often, containing a list of links.

<nav>
  <ul>
    <li><a href="/">Home</a></li>
    <li><a href="/blog">Blog</a></li>
    <li><a href="/contact">Contact</a></li>
    <li><a href="/about">About</a></li>
  </ul>
</nav>

See also 
 Web template

References

Web design
Graphical control elements
Graphical user interface elements